New story, A New Story, or New Stories may refer to:

Media
New Stories from the South, annual compilation of short stories published by Algonquin Books of Chapel Hill
A New Story (Jersey Shore), TV episode
A New Story, album by Kanon (singer)

Organizations
New Story (charity), a non-profit organization